Carl Au (born 24 March 1987) is a British actor, dancer, and singer. Having begun his career aged eleven, he appeared in multiple musical productions, before receiving a scholarship at Arts Educational Schools, London, to study acting and musical theatre. While attending the school, he was invited to feature in the Barbara Cook and Friends charity gala show, organised for Barbara Cook's eightieth birthday, and was awarded The Stephen Sondheim Society Prize for Student Performer of the Year, making him the inaugural recipient. After graduating, Au returned to stage productions, primarily in the West End of London.

He was cast in the BBC drama Waterloo Road in 2012 as troublesome student Barry Barry, marking his first television credit. He left the series over a year later and experienced guest roles in television series. Since then, he has experienced roles in plays Bright Phoenix, Ostrich Boys, and High Fidelity, as well as being cast in a lead role in the 2017–2018 touring production of Cilla The Musical. Au released his first single, "Uncle", in November 2020.

Early life 
Au was born on 24 March 1987, in Kirkby, Merseyside. He has British, Chinese and Irish heritage. Au received scholarships to three musical theatre colleges to study acting and musical theatre. Philip Key of the Daily Post called this "an unprecedented event in show business". He opted to study at the Arts Educational Schools, London, where he graduated in 2008.

Career 
Au began his stage career aged eleven. As a teenager, he appeared in Copperfield, a musical based on Dickens’ David Copperfield. He also appeared as young Benny in the stage production of Her Benny at the Liverpool Empire Theatre. In August 2005, he starred in the futuristic musical Lorenzo's Quest as protagonist Lorenzo. The actor featured in the 2006–2007 pantomime of Robin Hood and The Babes in the Wood at the Bournemouth Pavilion with three of his fellow Arts Educational College classmates. The run consisted of 48 performances and for the majority of the run, the actor was ill; nevertheless, he appeared in all the performances. In 2007, Au was invited to feature in the Barbara Cook and Friends charity gala show, organised for Barbara Cook's eightieth birthday. He dubbed it a "remarkable experience". From June to August 2008, Au appeared in the ensemble of High School Musical on Stage! for its London premiere at the Hammersmith Apollo. Later that year, he appeared in the Oxford Playhouse's 2008–2009 pantomime Sleeping Beauty. He went on to appear at the 2009 Brit Awards as one of the Pet Shop Boys dancers and has also performed with Lady Gaga.

The actor played the role of Nephew Fred in the 2009 production of A Christmas Carol at the Birmingham Repertory Theatre. In March 2010, Au's casting as the mute in The Fantasticks was announced; the production began in the West End in May. Between September and October 2010, Au appeared in the West End production of Bells Are Ringing at the Union Theatre, London; he portrayed Carl. In December 2010, it was announced that Au would join the West End cast of Jersey Boys as Joe Pesci, from 15 March 2011. At the Freedom Bar in London, the actor joined other West End actors in a one-night showcase of composer David Are songs, Slip Into Your Skin, on 18 March 2012.

In 2012, Au was cast in the BBC school drama Waterloo Road as troublesome student Barry Barry. The character was introduced as part of a family headed by accredited actress Zöe Lucker. The role marks Au's first television credit. After appearing in two series, Au departed the drama and filmed his final scenes in October 2013. Daily Mirror Clemmie Moodie praised Au's performance in Waterloo Road, opining that he managed to "effortlessly nail [his] delivery every time". The actor received a fanbase from his time on the drama and his fans continued to watch his stage roles. In February 2013, Au appeared in the Let's Dance For Comic Relief competition alongside four of his Waterloo Road co-stars. They performed a Spice Girls number dressed as the girl group; Au performed as Melanie C, which he was pleased with as he was the only performer who did not wear high heels. The actor told Kate Forrester of the Liverpool Echo that he relished the chance to "dance, sing and act all at the [same] time".

After leaving Waterloo Road, Au moved to London where he moved into a flat with friends. Shortly after, he auditioned for the lead, Alan 'Icarus' Flynn, in the play Bright Phoenix at the Everyman Theatre, Liverpool. The play ran throughout October 2014. Au enjoyed returning to theatre as he liked "the adrenaline that you can get from the audience". Au guest-starred in an episode of BBC medical drama Casualty in September 2014, and the following year, he appeared in an episode of Doctors as anxiety sufferer Karl Moran. In 2016, Au was cast in the Till Death Us Do Part episode of The Lost Sitcoms series. He was delighted to be cast as his late grandfather was a fan of the sitcom. That same year, the actor appeared in the Belgrade Theatre's production of Ostrich Boys. George Attwell of The Stage called the actor's performance "cartoonish yet consistently funny". Au was cast as Bobby in the 2017 touring production of Cilla The Musical, a biopic musical about the early career and music of Cilla Black. In September 2019, it was announced that Au would star as Dick in the UK premiere of the musical High Fidelity at the Turbine Theatre, running between October and December 2019.

Au released his debut single, "Uncle", on 1 November 2020, under the stage name Au. He announced the single two days prior to its release on his social media accounts. It is about him learning that he is about to be an uncle, and was released on his nephew's due date.

Filmography

Television

Stage

Discography

As lead artist

Awards and nominations

References 

British male television actors
Male actors from Liverpool
21st-century British male actors
British male stage actors
British male child actors
Living people
1987 births